Samuel del Campo (23 May 1882 – 1960) was a Chilean diplomat who was recognized as a Righteous Among the Nations for saving 1,200 Jews during the Holocaust by issuing them Chilean passports between 1941 and 1943. He and María Edwards are the only Chileans honored as such.

Biography 

Samuel del Campo was born on May 23, 1882 in Chile. He became a diplomat, and beginning in 1941, he worked as the chargé d'affaires for Chile in Bucharest, Romania. By this time, Romania was a dictatorship led by Ion Antonescu and allied with the Axis powers, and Romania took an active part in the Holocaust. As there was no official Polish diplomatic representation in Romania, the representation of Polish citizens was transferred to Chile, still a neutral country during the war. 

Del Campo began issuing Chilean passports to Polish Jews, saving them from deportation. He repeatedly pleaded with the Romanian government to save those who he had issued documents to, and according to Romanian historian Anca Tudorancea, “minutes from the Romanian Council of Ministers show that Samuel del Campo became a nuisance at the highest level.” Yad Vashem estimates that Del Campo rescued approximately 1,200 Jews by giving them passports, despite the Chilean government's official non-interference policy. In the spring of 1943, as the tide of war went against the Axis, diplomatic relations between Romania and Chile were severed. Del Campo was subsequently appointed as consul-general in Zürich, but the appointment never came into effect and del Campo left the employ of the Chilean government. He never returned to Chile and died in Paris, France, sometime in 1960.

He was recognized by Yad Vashem as a Righteous Among the Nations on November, 23, 2016, 56 years after his death. In 2021, The Chilean embassy in Bucharest unveiled a plaque in Del Campo's memory in front of the Great Synagogue of Bucharest.

References

1882 births
1960 deaths
Year of death missing
Chilean diplomats
Chilean Roman Catholics
Chilean people of World War II
Chilean Righteous Among the Nations
Catholic Righteous Among the Nations
People who rescued Jews during the Holocaust